The 2017–18 UC Davis Aggies men's basketball team represented the University of California, Davis during the 2017–18 NCAA Division I men's basketball season. The Aggies, led by seventh-year head coach Jim Les, played their home games at The Pavilion as members of the Big West Conference. They finished the season 22–11, 12–4 in Big West play to win the regular season championship. In the Big West tournament, they defeated UC Riverside before losing to Cal State Fullerton in the semifinals. As a regular season conference champion who did not win their conference tournament, the Aggies received an automatic bid to the National Invitation Tournament where they lost in the first round to Utah.

Previous season 
The Aggies finished the 2016–17 season 23–13, 11–5 in Big West play to finish in second place. They defeated Cal Poly, Cal State Fullerton, and UC Irvine to win the Big West tournament. As a result, they earned the conference's automatic bid to the NCAA tournament as a No. 16 seed. They defeated North Carolina Central in the First Four before losing in the first round to Kansas.

Offseason

Departures

Incoming transfers

2017 recruiting class

Roster

Schedule and results

|-
!colspan=9 style=| Exhibition

|-
!colspan=9 style=| Non-conference regular season

|-
!colspan=9 style=| Big West regular season

|-
!colspan=9 style=| Big West tournament

|-
!colspan=9 style=| NIT

References

UC Davis Aggies men's basketball seasons
UC Davis
UC Davis